The Family Plan is an upcoming American action comedy film directed by Simon Cellan Jones and written by David Coggeshall. It stars Mark Wahlberg and Michelle Monaghan. Filming took place in Atlanta, Georgia from October to November 2022.

Premise 
The Family Plan tells the story of a suburban dad, Dan (Wahlberg), who must take his family on the run when his past catches up with him.

Cast 
 Mark Wahlberg as Dan
 Michelle Monaghan
 Saïd Taghmaoui
 Maggie Q
 Zoe Colletti 
 Van Crosby
 Ciarán Hinds
 Felicia Pearson
 Miles Doleac as Gold Chain
 Valkyrae

Production 
On August 16, 2022, Apple announced an action comedy film from Skydance Media and Municipal Pictures to star Mark Wahlberg. In October 2022, Michelle Monaghan and Saïd Taghmaoui joined the cast. Other cast members added were Ciarán Hinds, Maggie Q, Zoe Colletti, Van Crosby and Miles Doleac.

Principal photography commenced in October 2022 in Atlanta, Georgia, under the working title, Holiday Road.  Shots of a helicopter were filmed in downtown Buffalo, New York in early November for the film.  An ice cream shop in Clermont, Georgia was transformed into Lambert's Diner for the film.

References

External links 
 

Upcoming films
American action comedy films
Apple TV+ original films
Films directed by Simon Cellan Jones
Films produced by Mark Wahlberg
Films shot in Atlanta
Films shot in Buffalo, New York
Skydance Media films
Upcoming English-language films